The 2017–18 New Hampshire Wildcats men's basketball team  represented the University of New Hampshire during the 2017–18 NCAA Division I men's basketball season. The Wildcats, led by 13th-year head coach Bill Herrion, played their home games at Lundholm Gym in Durham, New Hampshire as members of the America East Conference. They finished the season 10–21, 6–10 in America East play to finish in a tie for six place. They lost to Hartford in the quarterfinals of the America East tournament.

Previous season
The Wildcats finished the season 20–12, 10–6 in America East play to finish in a tie for third place. As the No. 4 seed in the America East tournament, they defeated UMBC in the quarterfinals before losing to Vermont in the semifinals.

Offseason

Departures

Incoming transfers

2017 recruiting class

Roster

Schedule and results

|-
!colspan=9 style=| Non-conference regular season

|-
!colspan=9 style=| America East regular season

|-
!colspan=9 style=| America East tournament

References

New Hampshire Wildcats men's basketball seasons
New Hampshire
Wild
Wild